Skitter Creek is a stream in the U.S. state of West Virginia.

Skitter Creek derives its name from the word "skeet" on account of its slippery river bed.

See also
List of rivers of West Virginia

References

Rivers of Fayette County, West Virginia
Rivers of West Virginia